Gondal is a city of about 115,000 residents and a municipality of about 175,000 in the Rajkot district of the Indian state of Gujarat. Gondal State was one of the eight first-class princely states of Kathiawar Agency, Bombay Presidency in British India. Ruled by a Hindu Rajput dynasty of the Jadeja clan, the capital of the state was Gondal town.

History

Gondal is mentioned in texts like Ain-i-Akbari (written in the reign of Akbar) and Mirat-i-Ahmadi as a Vaghela state in Sorath (Saurashtra). The Gondal State in Kathiawar Agency was founded in 1634 by Thakore Shri Kumbhoji I Meramanji from the Jadeja dynasty, who received Ardoi and other villages from his father Meramanji. Kumbhoki's fourth descendant, Kumbhoji IV, increased the size of the state by acquiring parganas such as Dhoraji, Upleta, and Sarai.

Sir Bhagwant Singhji, who reigned from 1888 until his death in 1944, was noted for tax reforms, compulsory education for women, and also for stopping the practice of purdah (female seclusion) at a time when the royal households of India were known for this tradition.

In 1901, Gondal city had a population of 19,592, and was a stop on the branch line between Rajkot and Jetalsar on the Viramgam–Rajkot and Rajkot–Somnath lines.

The ancestors of Muhammad Ali Jinnah, founder of Pakistan, belong to Paneli village in Gondal state.

Historical places

The Naulakha Palace is the oldest extant palace in Gondal, dating back to the 17th century. It has stone carvings with jharokhas (enclosed balconies), a pillared courtyard, delicately carved arches, and a unique spiral staircase. The large chandelier-lit durbar (court) contains stuffed panthers, gilt wooden furniture, and antique mirrors. The Private Palace Museum has a display of silver caskets which were used to carry messages and gifts for Maharajah Bhagvatsinhji during his silver jubilee as ruler of Gondal.

The Riverside Palace was built in 1875 by Maharajah Bhagwat Sinhji for his son, Yuvraj Bhojraji. It has groomed lawns and gardens, a living room furnished in typical colonial style with chandelier, antique wooden furniture and sofas, and an "Indian room" decorated with beadwork, brassware and paintings. The palace has now become a heritage hotel.

The Huzoor Palace is the current royal residence. One wing of this palace, called the Orchard palace, is open to the public. It was built as an annex of the Huzoor Palace in the late 19th century to host guests of the Maharajas. The property gets its name from the fruit orchards, lawns and gardens that surround the palace.

Orchard Palace was converted into a seven-room heritage hotel decorated with 1930s–1940s art deco furniture, antiques and handicrafts. The garden contains many types of birds, including a large population of peacocks. The Room of Miniatures is a sitting room with a collection of miniature paintings, brass, and furniture. One of the highlights of the palace is the Rail Saloon of the royal family of Gondal which has been converted into a suite with a drawing room, dining room and bedroom. The royal garages have an extensive collection of vintage and classic cars.

Thakurs  
The rulers of Gondal were Thakurs of the Jadeja dynasty who had the right to an 11-gun salute. They bore the title 'Thakur Sahib' from 1866 onwards.

Religious sites

The people of the Gondal, as in most of the other parts of Saurashtra, are considered highly spiritual.

The temples in Gondal include Akshar Mandir and Deri (BAPS Swaminarayan), Shri Trikamrayji Haveli, Shri Madanmohanji ni haveli (Moti Haveli), Shri Ramji Mandir, Bhuvneshwari Mandir (one of the few temples in India dedicated to this Goddess), Ashapura Mata, Sureshwar Mahadev, Dhareshwar Mahadev, Kashi Vishwanath Mahadev and the massive Ambey Dham (Ramanath) Temple. There is also another Pushtimargiya Haveli and Swaminarayan temple in the city centre.

The Akshar Deri, housed within the Akshar Mandir, is the samadhi sthan (memorial site) of Gunatitanand Swami, who was a paramhansa of Swaminarayan, and is accepted as the first spiritual successor of Swaminarayan by the Bochasanwasi Akshar Purushottam Swaminarayan Sanstha (BAPS). This temple is visited by people from all over the world.

Dasi Jeevan Mandir (temple) in Ghoghavadar,  from Gondal, is a site where Saint Dasi Jeevan lived. Every Gujarati New Year day, people gather to celebrate the holy saint's birthday.

Anand Ashrama, located easterly to Gondal close to Ghoghavadar, is a research center for folklore and Gujarati literature.

Geography
It has an average elevation of 132 metres (433 feet).

Demographics
Total Population of Gondal City as per last census was 113,000 Approx. while the Average Literacy rate is 84.3% much higher than the national average of 59% . The Demographic Distribution of the Gondal city as per 2011 census is as mentioned below :

Culture and economy

Gondal has a history of art and literature. It is the birthplace of poets, singers and artists like Pankaj Udhas, Manhar Udhas, Nirmal Udhas, Dhumketu, Makarand Dave, Jay Vasavada. The first Gujarati dictionary was compiled by the Chief Education Officer, Chandrakant Bechardas Patel in Gondal with the financial support of Sir Bhagvatsighji Maharaj. The Patel family was awarded the king's summer palace on Palace Road called Geeta Bhuvan and its surrounding lands for their life's work. This all-encompassing Gujarati dictionary called the Bhagvat GoMandal is available on both the App Store & Play Store in form of an app

Janmashtami is a major and important festival and usually a week-long holiday. The 'Janmashtami Lok Mela' is organized for five to seven days at Sangramsinhji highschool ground (college chowk) to celebrate Janmashtami.

The largest factors in the economy of Gondal are oil mills and marketing yards. Gondal is the largest producer of ground nut oil in Gujarat, with 300–500 oil mills. The marketing yard is one of the biggest in the Kathiawar region and the second largest in Gujarat, after Unjha. Gondal is growing in the cotton trade with the development of many ginning and pressing industries.

In addition, there are two Ayurvedic (alternative) medicine manufacturers in Gondal that export overseas, as well as businesses involved in jewelry design, timber trading, and hardware manufacturing. Farming is important in the outskirts of Gondal despite a shortage of water. The markets for most commodities in Gondal are in two areas known as Nani Bazaar (small market) and Moti Bazaar (large market). The main business areas in Gondal include Town Hall, Gundala Street, Nani Bazaar, Moti Bazaar, Kadiyalane, Bus stand road, and Kumbharwada.

Transportation from other parts of the country is primarily by road and rail. Gondal railway station, under the Bhavnagar railway division, serves Gondal city.

The main residential areas in Gondal include Bhojrajpara, G. Parekh Street,Khandheria Street, Gundala Street, Mahadevwadi, Housing Board, Station Plot, Gundala Road, Yoginagar, Kashi Vishwanath road, Kadavani Nagar, Shajanand Nagar, Khodiyar Nagar and Gokul Dham. The most upscale residential areas in Gondal are Bhojrajpara and Kailashbag, which are near to the bus station and the main market. Gardens and parks include Tulsi Baugh and Ashapura Gardens.

The schools in Gondal include St. Mary's School, Vidhya mandir, Patel Boarding, Akshar Purshotam Swami Narayan High School, and Highway Gurukul. Monghiba High school is one of the oldest girls' schools in the region.

Other landmarks in Gondal are the Center Theater, the Roma Theater, College Chowk, and the Victory Cinema.

In 1947, many people who spoke Memoni migrated to Pakistan.

See also
 Bhagvatsinhji
 Kambojas
 Kumbhoj
 Sage Kambhoja
 Kambu Swayambhuva

References

External links

 History and all information of Gondal http://www.marugondal.com
 Portal of Gondal Business www.gondalonline.com
 Portal of Gondal Heritage Palaces www.heritagepalacesgondal.com

Cities and towns in Rajkot district
Former capital cities in India
1634 establishments in India
Populated places established in 1634